Atef Najib (born 1964/1965) was a Syrian officer and the political security chief in the city of Daraa, and is a first cousin of President Assad. He is known as being a catalyst for one of the flashpoints that ignited the Syrian civil war, when in 2011 he directed the abduction and torture of 15 boys which had written anti-Assad slogans on a public area in Daraa. His aggressive actions prompted non-violent protests by local inhabitants, and - after fire was opened by security forces at a protest march - the gradual start of armed resistance.

References

Further reading
 
 
 
 

Assad family
Living people
Year of birth missing (living people)